The Archimedean spiral (also known as the arithmetic spiral) is a spiral named after the 3rd-century BC Greek mathematician Archimedes. It is the locus corresponding to the locations over time of a point moving away from a fixed point with a constant speed along a line that rotates with constant angular velocity. Equivalently, in polar coordinates  it can be described by the equation

Changing the parameter  moves the centerpoint of the spiral outward from the origin (positive  toward  and negative  toward ) essentially through a rotation of the spiral, while  controls the distance between loops.

From the above equation, it can thus be stated: position of particle from point of start is proportional to angle  as time elapses.

Archimedes described such a spiral in his book On Spirals.  Conon of Samos was a friend of his and Pappus states that this spiral was discovered by Conon.

Derivation of general equation of spiral 

A physical approach is used below to understand the notion of Archimedean spirals.

Suppose a point object moves in the Cartesian system with a constant velocity  directed parallel to the -axis, with respect to the -plane. Let at time , the object was at an arbitrary point . If the  plane rotates with a constant angular velocity  about the -axis, then the velocity of the point with respect to -axis may be written as:

The figure shown alongside explains this.

The above equations can be integrated by applying integration by parts, leading to the following parametric equations:

Squaring the two equations and then adding (and some small alterations) results in the Cartesian equation

(using the fact that  and ) or

Its polar form is

Arc length and curvature 

Given the parametrization in cartesian coordinates

or, equivalently:

The curvature is given by

Characteristics

The Archimedean spiral has the property that any ray from the origin intersects successive turnings of the spiral in points with a constant separation distance (equal to  if  is measured in radians), hence the name "arithmetic spiral". In contrast to this, in a logarithmic spiral these distances, as well as the distances of the intersection points measured from the origin, form a geometric progression.

The two arms are smoothly connected at the origin. Only one arm is shown on the accompanying graph. Taking the mirror image of this arm across the -axis will yield the other arm.

For large  a point moves with well-approximated uniform acceleration along the Archimedean spiral while the spiral corresponds to the locations over time of a point moving away from a fixed point with a constant speed along a line which rotates with constant angular velocity (see contribution from Mikhail Gaichenkov).

As the Archimedean spiral grows, its evolute asymptotically approaches a circle with radius .

General Archimedean spiral

Sometimes the term Archimedean spiral is used for the more general group of spirals

The normal Archimedean spiral occurs when . Other spirals falling into this group include the hyperbolic spiral, Fermat's spiral, and the lituus.

Applications
One method of squaring the circle, due to Archimedes, makes use of an Archimedean spiral.  Archimedes also showed how the spiral can be used to trisect an angle. Both approaches relax the traditional limitations on the use of straightedge and compass in ancient Greek geometric proofs.

The Archimedean spiral has a variety of real-world applications. Scroll compressors, used for compressing gases, have rotors that can be made from two interleaved Archimedean spirals, involutes of a circle of the same size that almost resemble Archimedean spirals, or hybrid curves.

Archimedean spirals can be found in spiral antenna, which can be operated over a wide range of frequencies.

The coils of watch balance springs and the grooves of very early gramophone records form Archimedean spirals, making the grooves evenly spaced (although variable track spacing was later introduced to maximize the amount of music that could be cut onto a record). 

Asking for a patient to draw an Archimedean spiral is a way of quantifying human tremor; this information helps in diagnosing neurological diseases.

Archimedean spirals are also used in digital light processing (DLP) projection systems to minimize the "rainbow effect", making it look as if multiple colors are displayed at the same time, when in reality red, green, and blue are being cycled extremely quickly. Additionally, Archimedean spirals are used in food microbiology to quantify bacterial concentration through a spiral platter.

They are also used to model the pattern that occurs in a roll of paper or tape of constant thickness wrapped around a cylinder.

Many dynamic spirals (such as the Parker spiral of the solar wind, or the pattern made by a Catherine's wheel) are Archimedean. For instance, the star LL Pegasi shows an approximate Archimedean spiral in the dust clouds surrounding it, thought to be ejected matter from the star that has been shepherded into a spiral by another companion star as part of a double star system.

See also

 Archimedes' screw
 Euler spiral
 Fermat's spiral
 Golden spiral
 Hyperbolic spiral
 List of spirals
 Logarithmic spiral
 Spiral of Theodorus
 Triple spiral symbol

References

External links

 Jonathan Matt making the Archimedean spiral interesting - Video : The surprising beauty of Mathematics - TedX Talks, Green Farms
 
 
 Page with Java application to interactively explore the Archimedean spiral and its related curves
 Online exploration using JSXGraph (JavaScript)
 Archimedean spiral at "mathcurve"

Squaring the circle
Spirals
Spiral
Articles with example R code